I Love the '80s is a decade nostalgia television program and the first installment of the I Love the... series that was produced by VH1, based on the BBC series of the same name. The first episode, "I Love 1980", premiered on December 16, 2002, and the final episode, "I Love 1989", premiered on December 20, 2002.

Commentators

Sasha Alexander
Anastacia
Apollonia
India.Arie
Tom Arnold
Christopher Atkins
Sebastian Bach
Jillian Barberie
Barenaked Ladies (Steven Page, Tyler Stewart and Ed Robertson)
Toni Basil
Bill Bellamy and Peter Facinelli
Richard Belzer
Beyoncé
Michael Ian Black
Jack Blades
Brian Boitano
Brian Bonsall
Meredith Brooks
David Bryan
Candace Cameron Bure
Jere Burns and Suzanne Pleshette
Timothy Busfield
Dean Cain
Carrot Top
Tom Cavanagh
Andrew Dice Clay
Clarence Clemons
Gary Cole
Mo Collins
Alice Cooper
Anderson Cooper
David Copperfield
Creed (Scott Phillips, Scott Stapp and Mark Tremonti) (*)
Tommy Davidson
Dana Delany
Mark Derwin
Dustin Diamond
Brooke Dillman and Constance Zimmer
Simon Doonan
Karen Duffy
Rich Eisen
Joe Elliott
Melissa Etheridge
Mark Feuerstein and Ashley Williams
Kim Fields
Greg Fitzsimmons
Heidi Fleiss
Dann Florek
Larry Flynt
Ben Folds
Foo Fighters (Dave Grohl and Taylor Hawkins) (*)
Matthew Fox
Doug E. Fresh
Soleil Moon Frye
Daisy Fuentes
Peter Gabriel
Willie Garson
Marla Gibbs
Judy Gold
Cuba Gooding, Jr.
David Gray
Kathy Griffin
Sammy Hagar
Ken Hakuta
Rob Halford
Mariska Hargitay
Dennis Haskins
Tommy Heath
Sherman Hemsley
Marilu Henner
Natasha Henstridge
Jason Hervey
Faith Hill
Cheryl Hines
Mark Hoppus
Finola Hughes
Bonnie Hunt
Alan Hunter
Ice-T
Chris Isaak
Rick James
Ron Jeremy
Betsey Johnson
Cherie Johnson
Greg Kihn
Kool & the Gang (Ronald Bell and Robert "Kool" Bell)
Uncle Kracker
Brian Krause
Wallace Langham
Sharon Lawrence
Juliette Lewis
Lisa Ling
Lisa Lisa
Lisa Loeb
Kenny Loggins
Donal Logue
Justin Long
George Lopez and Constance Marie
Mario Lopez
Traci Lords
Virginia Madsen
A Martinez
John Mayer
Walta McCarthy
Mark McGrath
A.J. McLean
Julian McMahon
Chris Meloni
Bret Michaels
Daryl "Chill" Mitchell
Monica
Eddie Money
Paul Mooney
Michael Moore
Marianne Muellerleile
Dave Mustaine
Mya
Nickelback (Ryan Peake and Chad Kroeger)
Terri Nunn
Patton Oswalt
Erik Palladino
Ray Parker Jr.
Nia Peeples
Tom Petty
Anita Pointer
Brian Posehn
Scott Poulson-Bryant
Rain Pryor
Josh Randall
Quiet Riot (Kevin DuBrow and Frankie Banali)
Leah Remini
Mary Lou Retton
Alfonso Ribeiro
Christina Ricci (*)
Lionel Richie
LeAnn Rimes
Mo Rocca
Nile Rodgers
Freddy Rodriguez
Henry Rollins
Jeffrey Ross
Kelly Rowland
Kevin Rowland
Darius Rucker
John Rzeznik
Richie Sambora
Tessie Santiago and Matt Letscher
Mia Sara
Dan Savage
Ricky Schroder
Stuart Scott
Jason Sehorn
Tommy Shaw
Michael Showalter
Molly Sims (*)
Dee Snider
Kevin Sorbo
Hal Sparks
Joel Stein
Kristy Swanson
Raven-Symoné
Robby Takac
Rob Thomas
Lea Thompson
Tiffany
Christopher Titus
John Travolta (*)
Aisha Tyler
Victor Webster
Kevin Weisman
JoBeth Williams
Debra Wilson
Nancy and Ann Wilson
Peter Wolf
B.D. Wong
Tom Wopat
Wyclef
Weird Al
Jacklyn Zeman

(*) = archive footage

Recurring segments
 Makeout Songs: Lionel Richie presents the love songs from each year.
 Babes: Bret Michaels presents the attractive female celebrities or fictional characters from each year.
 Hunks: Traci Lords presents the attractive male celebrities from each year.
 Public Service Announcement: A public service announcement (PSA) from each year is presented.
 Then and Now: "Weird Al" Yankovic compares trends of the given year and the present day.
 Mr. & Ms.: Andrew Dice Clay presents a male celebrity and a female celebrity of each year.
 Born In: Soleil Moon Frye presents the people, bands, and products that were born in each year.
 During the credits of every episode, a clip from a popular music video was played without any type of commentary. These were usually replaced with a show promo by Vh1.

Topics covered by year

1980
 The Love Boat (originally premiered in 1977)
 Caddyshack
 "Turning Japanese" by The Vapors
 Punk and preppy fashion
 Strawberry Shortcake 
 Brooke Shields 
 Designer jeans
 "All Out of Love" by Air Supply
 Pat Benatar and Deborah Harry
 Who shot J.R.?
 9 to 5
 Urban Cowboy
 "Another One Bites the Dust" by Queen
 Kenny Rogers
 Xanadu
 Airplane!
 "Rapper's Delight" by The Sugarhill Gang (originally released in 1979)
 "Brass in Pocket" by The Pretenders (originally released in 1979)
 Mattel Electronic Football
 Miracle on Ice
 That's Incredible!
 The Empire Strikes Back

Makeout Songs of 1980: "Every Woman in the World" by Air Supply, "Longer" by Dan Fogelberg and "Do That to Me One More Time" by Captain & Tennille

Babes of 1980: Princess Leia, Bo Derek, Charlene Tilton, Victoria Principal and Suzanne Somers

Hunks of 1980: Richard Gere, Jim Palmer, John Travolta, Erik Estrada and Greg Evigan

PSA of 1980: Give a Kid a Book PSA

Then and Now 1980: Sony Walkman with Cassette (Then: $169.00 / Now: $19.95), Ross Harris (Then: Movie star of Airplane! / Now: Video star of "Sad Caper" by Hootie and the Blowfish) and The Big Gulp (Then: 32 oz. / Now: 64 oz.)

Mr. & Ms. 1980: Ronald Reagan and Daisy Duke

Born in 1980: Christina Aguilera, Post-it notes, ethnic Barbie dolls and Macaulay Culkin

1981
 Cable television, MTV, and scrambled pornography
 Porky's
 Reagan assassination attempt
 Pope John Paul II assassination attempt
 The Royal Wedding
 Luke and Laura Spencer
 Rick Springfield
 Arthur
 The Greatest American Hero
 DMC DeLorean
 Rubik's Cube 
 "Celebration" by Kool & the Gang
 Fridays 
 Stripes
 Bosom Buddies
 John McEnroe
 "Private Eyes" by Hall & Oates
 Members Only jackets
 Atari 2600 
 The Jeffersons 
 Raiders of the Lost Ark

Makeout Songs of 1981: "Keep on Loving You" by REO Speedwagon, "Waiting For a Girl Like You" by Foreigner and "Endless Love" by Lionel Richie and Diana Ross

Babes of 1981: Olivia Newton-John, Donna Dixon, Valerie Bertinelli, Kathleen Turner and Sandra Day O'Connor

Hunks of 1981: Patrick Duffy, Burt Reynolds, Harrison Ford, Mick Jagger and Richard Simmons

PSA of 1981: Girl Scouts in Gymnastics

Then and Now 1981: Tom Cruise (Then: Endless Love - $33 Million / Now: Endless Cash - $25 Million), Movie Tickets (Then: $3.00 / Now: $10.00) and Suntan Lotion (Then: Tanning oil / Now: Hawaiian Tropic Ozone SPF 70)

Mr. & Ms. 1981: Tom Selleck and Sheena Easton

Born in 1981: Alicia Keys, Beyoncé Knowles, the laptop computer, Justin Timberlake, Britney Spears, the thong, Serena Williams and Metallica

1982
 Mullets
 VJs
 "Mickey" by Toni Basil
 Fast Times at Ridgemont High
 "Centerfold" by The J. Geils Band 
 Square Pegs
 Rocky III
 Ozzy Osbourne
 "I Love Rock 'N Roll" by Joan Jett & the Blackhearts 
 The Dukes of Hazzard 
 The Go-Go's
 Aerobics 
 "I Ran (So Far Away)" by A Flock of Seagulls
 Trivial Pursuit
 Keytar
 Joanie Loves Chachi
 Pac-Man and Ms. Pac-Man 
 "867-5309/Jenny" by Tommy Tutone 
 Dungeons & Dragons
 Poltergeist
 "The Message" by Grandmaster Flash & the Furious Five
 Silver Spoons
 E.T. the Extra-Terrestrial

Makeout Songs of 1982: "Up Where We Belong" by Joe Cocker & Jennifer Warnes and "Truly" by Lionel Richie

Babes of 1982: Kim Wilde, Rae Dawn Chong, Kirstie Alley, Pia Zadora and Tootsie

Hunks of 1982: John Stamos, David Lee Roth, Sting, Bruce Springsteen and the Soloflex Guy

PSA of 1982: Time for Timer's "Sunshine on a Stick" PSA

Then and Now 1982: Cats (Then: On Broadway now and forever / Now: Gone), Scott Schwartz (Then: Child star of The Toy / Now: Porn star) and Concert Tickets for The Who (Then: Farewell tour - $25.00 / Now: Reunion tour - $250.00)

Mr. & Ms. 1982: Eddie Murphy and Heather Locklear

Born in 1982: Kirsten Dunst, Prince William, Diet Coke, Public Enemy and liposuction

1983
 National Lampoon's Vacation
 Family Ties 
 Nancy Reagan guest stars on Diff'rent Strokes
 Cabbage Patch Kids 
 Michael Jackson's Thriller album
 Flashdance
 Duran Duran
 Valley girl 
 "Love Is a Battlefield" by Pat Benatar
 Scarface
 The A-Team
 Def Leppard's Pyromania album
 Eddie Murphy Delirious
 "Come on Eileen" by Dexys Midnight Runners
 Jerry Falwell vs. Larry Flynt
 Knight Rider 
 WarGames
 Wacky WallWalker
 "Mr. Roboto" by Styx
 He-Man and the Masters of the Universe
 Return of the Jedi

Makeout Songs of 1983: "Every Breath You Take" by The Police, "True" by Spandau Ballet and "Sexual Healing" by Marvin Gaye

Babes of 1983: Maud Adams, Vanity, Joan Collins, Christie Brinkley and Rebecca De Mornay

Hunks of 1983: Lee Horsley, Rob Lowe, Marvin Gaye, Bruce Boxleitner and Chewbacca

PSA of 1983: Smokey Bear - Mask of Joanna Cassidy

Then and Now 1983: Talent Shows (Then: Star Search / Now: American Idol), Cellular Phones (Then: $3,000 / Now: Given Away) and Home Video Cameras (Then: Sony Betamovie - 6.5 lbs. / Now: Sony MicroMV Handycam - 12 oz.)

Mr. & Ms. 1983: Tom Cruise and Ms. Pac-Man

Born in 1983: Michelle Branch, Bon Jovi, the Nintendo Entertainment System, Taylor Hanson and the Red Hot Chili Peppers

1984
 Breakdancing and Breakin'
 Footloose
 Madonna
 "Sunglasses at Night" by Corey Hart
 "Where's the beef?"
 Bruce Springsteen's Born in the U.S.A. album
 Mary Lou Retton
 Webster and Punky Brewster 
 Huey Lewis and the News
 Miami Vice
 The Terminator
 Transformers and Care Bears
 Wham!
 Prince
 Sixteen Candles
 Cyndi Lauper
 Michael Jackson's Pepsi commercial disaster
 "Hello" by Lionel Richie
This Is Spinal Tap

Makeout Songs of 1984: "Almost Paradise" by Mike Reno & Ann Wilson, "Against All Odds" by Phil Collins and "Missing You" by John Waite

Babes of 1984: Paulina Porizkova, Daryl Hannah, Tina Turner, Heather Thomas and Geraldine Ferraro

Hunks of 1984: Ralph Macchio, Matt Dillon, C. Thomas Howell, Duran Duran and Tom Hulce

PSA of 1984: "Don't let your lungs go to pot." - Cast of Fame

Then and Now 1984: Recreational Family Vehicles (Then: Chrysler Caravan - $8,669 / Now: Ford Explorer - $24,620), Super Bowl Tickets (Then: $60.00 / Now: $325.00) and The Mac (Then: 131,000 bytes of memory / Now: 500,000,000 bytes of memory)

Mr. & Ms. 1984: Boy George

Born in 1984: Mandy Moore, Freddy Krueger, Kelly Osbourne, hair mousse and Punky Brewster

1985
 WrestleMania
 MacGyver
 Back to the Future
 "Home Sweet Home" by Mötley Crüe
 The Goonies
 Pee-wee's Big Adventure
 Small Wonder
 "Summer of '69" by Bryan Adams
 Big hair
 Fletch
 "The Super Bowl Shuffle"
 Bartles & Jaymes 
 Cocoon
 "Voices Carry" by Til Tuesday
 Live Aid
 The Facts of Life
 "Party All the Time" by Eddie Murphy
 The Breakfast Club and St. Elmo's Fire
 Day-Glo and oversized message T-shirts
 Pound Puppies 
 "We Are the World" by USA for Africa and heavy metal musicians form Hear 'n Aid

Makeout Songs of 1985: "Careless Whisper" by Wham!, "Smooth Operator" by Sade and "Crazy for You" by Madonna

Babes of 1985: Kelly LeBrock, Kelly McGillis, Rosanna Arquette, Grace Slick and Tipper Gore

Hunks of 1985: Sylvester Stallone, William "The Refrigerator" Perry, Robert Redford, Jim McMahon and Pee-wee Herman

PSA of 1985: Contract for Life

Then and Now 1985: Hit Soft Drinks (Then: New Coke / Now: Vanilla Coke) and Pro Wrestling (Then: Hulk Hogan / Now: The Rock)

Mr. & Ms. 1985: Dolph Lundgren and Brigitte Nielsen

Born in 1985: Zac Hanson, Air Jordans, Frankie Muniz, Lee Press-On Nails and VH1

1986
 Ferris Bueller's Day Off
 Wheel of Fortune (originally premiered in 1975)
 Hands Across America
 Teddy Ruxpin
 ALF
 Pretty in Pink
 "Papa Don't Preach" by Madonna
 Swatch 
 1986 World Series and the Bill Buckner fielding error
 The Cosby Show (originally premiered in 1984)
 Baby On Board
 "Crocodile" Dundee
 Celebrity marriages (specifically Tommy Lee & Heather Locklear, Arnold Schwarzenegger & Maria Shriver and Tatum O'Neal & John McEnroe)
 Whitney Houston
 Comic Relief
 Janet Jackson
 Stand by Me
 "Walk This Way" by Run-DMC and Aerosmith
 Top Gun

Makeout Songs of 1986: "Take My Breath Away" by Berlin, "The Next Time I Fall" by Peter Cetera & Amy Grant and "Secret Lovers" by Atlantic Starr

Babes of 1986: Susanna Hoffs, Kim Basinger, Stevie Nicks, Bette Midler and the Statue of Liberty

Hunks of 1986: Tom Cruise, Walter Payton, Paul Hogan, Keith Hernandez and Howard the Duck

PSA of 1986: "Vote With A Friend.  Make It Count More" with Quincy Jones and James Ingram

Then and Now 1986: Highest Baseball Salary (Then: Gary Carter - $2 Million / Now: Alex Rodriguez - $22 Million), David Lee Roth & Sammy Hagar (Then: Rivals / Now: Together) and Ted Danson & Kelsey Grammer (Then: Ted Danson making $45,000 an episode on Cheers / Now: Kelsey Grammer making $1,600,000 an episode on Frasier)

Mr. & Ms. 1986: Mike Tyson and Oprah Winfrey

Born in 1986: Mary-Kate & Ashley Olsen, the Goo Goo Dolls, Jolt Cola, the Pixies and the disposable camera

1987
 Dirty Dancing
 Tiffany and Debbie Gibson
 Hair crimping
 Lisa Lisa and Cult Jam
 Fatal Attraction
 Hair metal (specifically Poison, Bon Jovi, Def Leppard, Guns N' Roses and Mötley Crüe)
 FOX (specifically The Tracey Ullman Show, Married... with Children and 21 Jump Street)
 "It's the End of the World as We Know It (And I Feel Fine)" by R.E.M.
 Controversial extra-marital affairs (specifically Oliver North and Fawn Hall, Gary Hart and Donna Rice, Jim and Tammy Faye Bakker and Jessica Hahn)
 Wall Street
 "(You Gotta) Fight for Your Right (To Party!)" by Beastie Boys
 Acid wash and Converse
 Cheers (originally aired from 1982)
 "Push It" by Salt-N-Pepa
 Hollywood Shuffle
 "Addicted to Love" by Robert Palmer
 The two Coreys
 U2's The Joshua Tree album

Makeout Songs of 1987: "At This Moment" by Billy Vera & The Beaters, "Don't Dream It's Over" by Crowded House and "I Need Love" by LL Cool J

Babes of 1987: Lisa Bonet, Sheena Easton, Jody Watley, Tawny Kitaen and the Church Lady

Hunks of 1987: LL Cool J, RoboCop, Dennis Quaid, Harry Hamlin and Harry from Harry and the Hendersons

PSA of 1987: Anti-Drug (Marijuana): "I learned it by watching you!"

Then and Now 1987: Richest Person in America (Then: Sam Walton - $4,500,000,000 / Now: Bill Gates - $43,000,000,000), Baby Jessica (Then: Stuck in a well / Now: Well adjusted) and Axl Rose (Then: New face of rock 'n' roll / Now: New face)

Mr. & Ms. 1987: Bruce Willis and Cher

Born in 1987: Lil' Bow Wow, Aaron Carter, Nirvana and condom commercials

1988
 Mike Tyson
 Child's Play
 Roseanne
 "Never Gonna Give You Up" by Rick Astley
 Guns N' Roses
 The Wonder Years
 Modern Rock (specifically INXS, The Cure, Morrissey, Depeche Mode, and Erasure)
 Teenage Mutant Ninja Turtles  (originally aired from 1987) 
 "Don't Worry Be Happy" by Bobby McFerrin
 The California Raisins 
 Perfect Strangers (originally aired from 1986) 
 George Michael's Faith  album
 Pictionary and Win, Lose or Draw ("Win, Lose or Draw" was originally aired from 1987) 
 "Red Red Wine" by UB40
 Working woman's wardrobe and Color Me Beautiful
 Yo! MTV Raps, "Parents Just Don't Understand" by DJ Jazzy Jeff & the Fresh Prince and N.W.A/the rise of gangsta rap
 Who's the Boss? (originally aired from 1984) 
 Terence Trent D'Arby
 The neo-hippie movement
 "Touch of Grey" by Grateful Dead
 Rain Man

Makeout Songs of 1988: "She's Like the Wind" by Patrick Swayze, "Hold On to the Nights" by Richard Marx and "The Flame" by Cheap Trick

Babes of 1988: Jessica Rabbit, Kari Wuhrer, Samantha Fox, Julia Roberts and Divine

Hunks of 1988: John F. Kennedy Jr., Donald Trump, Kevin Costner, Joe Montana and Dan Quayle

PSA of 1988: Buckle Up (Car Crash Test Dummies)

Then and Now 1988: A Year of Tuition at Harvard (Then: $12,000 / Now: $35,000), Ricki Lake (Then: 250 lbs. / Now: 120 lbs.) and 100-Meter Sprint (Then: Ben Johnson - 9.79 seconds / Now: Tim Montgomery - 9.78 seconds)

Mr. and Ms. 1988: ALF and Debbie Gibson

Born in 1988: Haley Joel Osment, Teddy Grahams, Miami Heat, En Vogue and Prozac

1989
 New Kids on the Block
 Bill and Ted's Excellent Adventure
 Milli Vanilli
 Game Boy and Tetris
 Cops
 Rob Lowe's sex video
 "If I Could Turn Back Time" by Cher
 Do the Right Thing
 "Like a Prayer" by Madonna and the ensuing Pepsi controversy
 Say Anything...
 The Arsenio Hall Show
 "Love Shack" by The B-52's
 Bobby Brown
 Afrocentric clothing
 Baywatch
 "Love in an Elevator" by Aerosmith
 Heathers
 Saved by the Bell
 "Funky Cold Medina" by Tone Loc
 Fall of the Berlin Wall

Makeout Songs of 1989: "Right Here Waiting" by Richard Marx, "If You Don't Know Me by Now" by Simply Red and "Lovesong" by The Cure

Babes of 1989: Winona Ryder, Paula Abdul, Tiffani-Amber Thiessen, Claudia Schiffer and Barbara Bush

Hunks of 1989: Batman, The Joker, Johnny Depp, Mel Gibson and Leonardo

PSA of 1989: Madonna on AIDS Prevention

Then and Now 1989: Bushes (Then: George H. W. Bush / Now: George W. Bush), Justin Timberlake (Then: Mouseketeer / Now: Michael Jackson) and World Wide Web (Then: Dialing up / Now: Off the hook)

Mr. and Ms. 1989: Fab Morvan and Meg Ryan

Born in 1989: Daniel Radcliffe, Hole, Hootie & the Blowfish, Lil' Romeo and American Gladiators

References

External links
 
 I Love the 80's on Internet Archive

Nostalgia television shows
Nostalgia television in the United States
VH1 original programming
2000s American television miniseries
2002 American television series debuts
2002 American television series endings